Leandro Domingues Barbosa (born 24 August 1983 in Vitória da Conquista), known as Leandro Domingues, is a Brazilian footballer who plays as an attacking midfielder for Yokohama F.C.

Club career
After four seasons with Kashiwa Reysol, he was transferred to Nagoya Grampus. After playing for one and a half seasons, he was released in November 2015. After a brief return to Brazil, he signed with Yokohama FC in mid-season 2017.

Career stats
Updated to 1 March 2019.

Honours

Club
Vitória
Campeonato Baiano: 2002, 2003, 2004, 2005, 2009, 2016
Copa do Nordeste: 2003

Cruzeiro
Campeonato Mineiro: 2008

Kashiwa Reysol
J2 League: 2010
J1 League: 2011
Japanese Super Cup: 2012
Emperor's Cup: 2012
J.League Cup: 2013

Individual
J. League Most Valuable Player: 2011
J. League Best Eleven: 2011, 2012

References

External links

Profile at Yokohama FC

1983 births
Living people
People from Vitória da Conquista
Brazilian footballers
Association football midfielders
Campeonato Brasileiro Série A players
Esporte Clube Vitória players
Cruzeiro Esporte Clube players
Fluminense FC players
Associação Portuguesa de Desportos players
J1 League players
J2 League players
Kashiwa Reysol players
Nagoya Grampus players
Yokohama FC players
J1 League Player of the Year winners
Brazilian expatriate footballers
Brazilian expatriate sportspeople in Japan
Expatriate footballers in Japan
Sportspeople from Bahia